KBMG (106.3 FM) is a radio station broadcasting a Spanish-language Contemporary Hits format as "Latino." Licensed to Evanston, Wyoming, United States, it serves southwestern Wyoming and the Wasatch Front area. The station is owned by Alpha Media.

History
The station, originally broadcasting on 106.1 FM, went on the air as KOTB on December 28, 1981, and primarily served the community of Evanston, Wyoming with a full-service format, playing adult contemporary music, airing local news updates, and some local high school and University of Wyoming sports.

On September 23, 2004, the station changed its call sign to KRMF and on March 30, 2005, to the current KBMG when the station relaunched with on-channel boosters covering the Wasatch Front. The station aired Bustos Media's "Magia" (Spanish Adult Contemporary) format. In September 2010, Bustos transferred most of its licenses to Adelante Media Group as part of a settlement with its lenders. who then switched the station to Spanish-language Adult Hits "Juan." One year later, the station rebranded as "Latino" in September 2011.

Alpha Media bought Adelante's Salt Lake City stations for $3.15 million on July 16, 2015. KBMG moved to 106.3 FM on September 23, 2015, and was licensed to operate on that frequency on October 8, 2015.

References

External links

BMG
Radio stations established in 1981
Contemporary hit radio stations in the United States
Latin rhythmic radio stations
Uinta County, Wyoming
Alpha Media radio stations